The 2017 Lakeside World Professional Darts Championship was the 40th World Championship organised by the British Darts Organisation, and the 32nd staging at the Lakeside Country Club at Frimley Green.

Format and qualifiers
The cutoff for qualification through the BDO Invitational Tables was on 30 September 2016. Additional qualifiers were determined in playoffs held on 30 November 2016.

Men's

Top 16 (seeded)
  Glen Durrant (winner)
  Scott Mitchell (second round)
  Danny Noppert (runner-up)
  Jamie Hughes (semi-final)
  Martin Adams (quarter-final)
  Scott Waites (quarter-final)
  Dean Reynolds (first round)
  Darius Labanauskas (quarter-final)
  Wesley Harms (first round)
  Darryl Fitton (semi-final)
  Mark McGeeney (second round)
  Brian Dawson (first round)
  Jim Williams (second round)
  Richard Veenstra (second round)
  Geert De Vos (quarter-final)
  Martin Phillips (first round)

17–24 in BDO rankings (first round)

25–26 in BDO rankings (preliminary round)

2016 finalist not in top 26 (preliminary round)

Regional table qualifiers (preliminary round)

Playoff qualifiers (preliminary round)

Women's

Top 8 (seeded)
  Deta Hedman (first round)
  Lisa Ashton (winner)
  Aileen de Graaf (semi-final)
  Anastasia Dobromyslova (semi-final)
  Lorraine Winstanley (quarter-final)
  Trina Gulliver (quarter-final)
  Fallon Sherrock (quarter-final)
  Corrine Hammond (runner-up)

9–14 in BDO rankings

Playoff qualifiers

Draw bracket

Men

Preliminary round
All matches are the first to 3 sets.

Last 32

Women

Youth
For the third consecutive year, a youth final was played on the Lakeside stage during the Championships. In November 2016, the Youth tournament was played down to the final two. The final took place on 12 January, and was contested between 14 year old Nathan Girvan from Scotland and 16 year old Justin van Tergouw from the Netherlands. The format was first to three sets.

Justin van Tergouw was crowned champion, after only dropping one leg and recording a 3–0 victory, whilst throwing a three dart average of 88.20.

TV coverage
Starting from this year's World Championship Channel 4 signed a 2-year deal to broadcast both the men's and women's World Championship. Channel 4 showed afternoon games and the first semi final. BT Sport showed the evening games and the second semi final. The final was shown on both channels.

Outside of the United Kingdom, live coverage of all matches was provided by YouTube on the BDO's own channel.

Channel 4
It was announced in December 2016 that Rob Walker would present Channel 4's World Darts coverage. He was joined in the studio by analysts Deta Hedman and Paul Nicholson. Bobby George also featured in Channel 4's coverage, however, unlike the BBC where he was their main pundit, he instead did 'special features'. Reporters for the tournament were Seema Jaswal and Danny Crates. In a similar arrangement that the BBC had with BT Sport, they shared commentary teams. This was led by John Rawling who was joined by Vassos Alexander and Jim Proudfoot in the commentary booth.

Channel 4 had the rights to all afternoon sessions, the first men's semi final, and shared coverage of the men's final.

BT Sport
BT Sport broadcast their 3rd BDO World Darts Championships. Ray Stubbs, who presented BT Sport's coverage of darts since its inception, moved to Talksport 2 and was replaced by Matt Smith. He was joined in the studio alongside two-time Lakeside semi finalist Chris Mason who acted as their analyst throughout the championships. They shared the same commentary team as Channel 4 which was led by John Rawling, with Vassos Alexander and Jim Proudfoot also in the commentary box, alongside Mason and Paul Nicholson. Reshmin Chowdury was BT Sport's roving reporter from the Lakeside once again. BT Sport broadcast each evening session, the 2nd men's semi final and shared coverage of the final.

References

External links
BDOdarts.com
LakesideWorldDarts.co.uk

2017
2017 in darts
2017 in English sport
Sport in Surrey
Frimley Green
January 2017 sports events in the United Kingdom